The Christofides algorithm or Christofides–Serdyukov algorithm is an algorithm for finding approximate solutions to the travelling salesman problem, on instances where the distances form a metric space (they are symmetric and obey the triangle inequality).
It is an approximation algorithm that guarantees that its solutions will be within a factor of 3/2 of the optimal solution length, and is named after Nicos Christofides and Anatoliy I. Serdyukov, who discovered it independently in 1976.

This algorithm still stands as the best polynomial time approximation algorithm that has been thoroughly peer-reviewed by the relevant scientific community for the traveling salesman problem on general metric spaces. In July 2020 however, Karlin, Klein, and Gharan released a preprint in which they introduced a novel approximation algorithm and claimed that its approximation ratio is 1.5 − 10−36. Their method follows similar principles to Christofides' algorithm, but uses a randomly chosen tree from a carefully chosen random distribution in place of the minimum spanning tree. The paper was published at STOC'21 where it received a best paper award.

Algorithm 
Let  be an instance of the travelling salesman problem.

Then the algorithm can be described in pseudocode as follows.
By the handshaking lemma,  has an even number of vertices.
 Make the circuit found in previous step into a Hamiltonian circuit by skipping repeated vertices (shortcutting).

The steps 5 and 6 do not necessarily yield only one result. As such the heuristic can give several different paths.

Approximation ratio 

The cost of the solution produced by the algorithm is within 3/2 of the optimum.
To prove this, let  be the optimal traveling salesman tour. Removing an edge from  produces a spanning tree, which must have weight at least that of the minimum spanning tree, implying that .
Each set of paths corresponds to a perfect matching of  that matches the two endpoints of each path, and the weight of this matching is at most equal to the weight of the paths.
The minimum-weight perfect matching can have no larger weight, so .
Thanks to the triangle inequality, shortcutting does not increase the weight,
so the weight of the output is also at most .

Lower bounds
There exist inputs to the travelling salesman problem that cause the Christofides algorithm to find a solution whose approximation ratio is arbitrarily close to 3/2. One such class of 
inputs are formed by a path of  vertices, with the path edges having weight , together with a set of edges connecting vertices two steps apart in the path with weight 
for a number  chosen close to zero but positive. All remaining edges of the complete graph have distances given by the shortest paths in this subgraph.
However, the optimal solution uses the edges of weight  together with two weight- edges incident to the endpoints of the path,
Hence we obtain an approximation ratio of 3/2.

Example

References

External links
 NIST Christofides Algorithm Definition

1976 in computing
Travelling salesman problem
Graph algorithms
Spanning tree
Approximation algorithms